Surfing Strange is the second full-length album by Swearin'. It was released on November 5, 2013 on Salinas Records. Unlike the band's 2012 debut album, it features vocals from the band's bassist Keith Spencer.

Track listing
 "Dust in the Gold Sack"
 "Watered Down"
 "Mermaid"
 "Parts of Speech"
 "Melanoma"
 "Echo Locate"
 "Loretta's Flowers"
 "Glare of the Sun"
 "Unwanted Place"
 "Young"
 "Curdled"

References

External links
Album Website

Swearin' albums
2013 albums